Havig is a surname. Notable people with the surname include: 

Christian Møinichen Havig (1825–1912), Norwegian bailiff and politician
Dennis Havig (born 1949), American football player
Fredrik Havig (1855–1927),  Norwegian judge, mayor, and politician
Jørgen Johannes Havig (1908–1883), Norwegian bailiff, farm owner, and politician